James Akinjo (born November 27, 2000) is an American professional basketball player for the Westchester Knicks of the NBA G League. He played college basketball for the Georgetown Hoyas and the Arizona Wildcats and Baylor Bears.

Early life and high school career
Akinjo grew up in the crime-ridden Las Deltas Housing projects in North Richmond, California. He was raised by his grandmother, Roberta Stevenson, because his mother, Monique Divers, died from leukemia when he was a toddler. When Akinjo was 13 years old, his brother died. Many of his friends were also murdered. His father, who is only 16 years older than him, and his uncle were imprisoned or jailed during his childhood. From a young age, Akinjo aspired to become a basketball player and drew inspiration from Chris Paul. At age 11, he was featured in the East Bay Times, who touted him as a "basketball prodigy." 

Akinjo played for Salesian College Preparatory in Richmond, California, where he was coached by Bill Mellis. As a freshman, he stood 5'8 but had a growth spurt. At the 2017 MLK Classic, Akinjo scored 29 points in a 45–36 win over St. John Bosco-Bellflower. As a senior, he averaged 20.7 points and 5.2 assists per game, leading his team to a 30–2 record and the CIF North Coast Section Division III title.

Recruiting
A four-star recruit, he originally committed to UConn but after the firing of head coach Kevin Ollie switched his commitment to Georgetown.

College career
On November 19, 2018, Akinjo earned his first Big East Conference Freshman of the Week honors after averaging 14.3 points and 4.7 assists per game in three games. He made a three-pointer with 4.9 seconds left in regulation to force overtime in a 76–73 win over South Florida. On December 22, Akinjo scored a season-high 25 points in a 102–94 victory over Arkansas–Little Rock. He matched his career-high on March 9, 2019, scoring 25 points with five three-pointers in an 86–84 win over 16th-ranked Marquette. At the end of the regular season, Akinjo was named Big East Freshman of the Year and was a unanimous pick for the Big East All-Freshman Team. As a freshman, he averaged 13.4 points, 5.2 assists, 2.9 rebounds and 1.1 steals per game.

Akinjo made his sophomore debut on November 6, 2019, scoring 20 points, including 17 in the second half, in an 81–68 win over Mount St. Mary's. On December 2, it was announced that Akinjo had left Georgetown and was entering the transfer portal along with several other Georgetown players. In seven games, he averaged 13.4 points, 4.4 assists and three rebounds per game. On January 1, 2020, Akinjo committed to Arizona. He was granted a waiver for immediate eligibility on September 1. As a junior, he averaged 15.6 points and 5.4 assists per game, earning First Team All-Pac-12 honors. On March 31, 2021, Akinjo declared for the 2021 NBA draft with the possibility of returning to school. He transferred to Baylor.

On December 28, 2021, Akinjo scored a career-high 27 points and had nine assists in a 104-68 win against Northwestern State. He missed a game against West Virginia on January 18, 2022, due to an injured tailbone. Akinjo was named to the First Team All-Big 12.

Professional career

Westchester Knicks (2022–present)
After going undrafted in the 2022 NBA draft, Akinjo was signed by the Atlanta Hawks for the 2022 NBA Summer League. On October 14, 2022, Akinjo signed with the New York Knicks, but was waived on October 15.

On October 23, 2022, Akinjo joined the Westchester Knicks training camp roster.

Career statistics

College

|-
| style="text-align:left;"|2018–19
| style="text-align:left;"|Georgetown
| 33 || 32 || 31.6 || .365 || .391 || .812 || 2.9 || 5.2 || 1.1 || .0 || 13.4
|-
| style="text-align:left;"|2019–20
| style="text-align:left;"|Georgetown
| 7 || 7 || 30.7 || .337 || .242 || .813 || 3.0 || 4.4 || 2.0 || .0 || 13.4
|-
| style="text-align:left;"|2020–21
| style="text-align:left;"|Arizona
| 26 || 26 || 34.9 || .379 || .408 || .819 || 2.3 || 5.4 || 1.4 || .0 || 15.6
|-
| style="text-align:left;"|2021–22
| style="text-align:left;"|Baylor
| 32 || 32 || 33.1 || .383 || .295 || .835 || 2.8 || 5.8 || 2.0 || .0 || 13.5
|- class="sortbottom"
| style="text-align:center;" colspan="2"|Career
| 98 || 97 || 32.9 || .373 || .354 || .820 || 2.7 || 5.4 || 1.6 || .0 || 14.0

Personal life
Akinjo's father played basketball for McClymonds High School in Oakland, California in the late 1990s.

References

External links
 Georgetown Hoyas bio
 Arizona Wildcats bio
 Baylor Bears bio

2000 births
Living people
All-American college men's basketball players
American men's basketball players
Arizona Wildcats men's basketball players
Basketball players from Oakland, California
Baylor Bears men's basketball players
Georgetown Hoyas men's basketball players
Point guards
Westchester Knicks players